Pavlo Bal (born 12 June 1986) is a Ukrainian para-biathlete and para cross-country skier.

Early life
Bal was born on 12 June 1986.

Career
At the 2021 World Para Snow Sports Championships in biathlon, Bal won the gold medal at the 12.5 event.

References

External links
 

1986 births
Living people
Ukrainian male biathletes
Ukrainian male cross-country skiers
Paralympic cross-country skiers of Ukraine
Paralympic biathletes of Ukraine
Cross-country skiers at the 2022 Winter Paralympics
Biathletes at the 2022 Winter Paralympics
20th-century Ukrainian people
21st-century Ukrainian people